Asociația Club Sportiv SR Municipal Brașov, commonly known as SR Brașov or simply Brașov, is a Romanian football club based in the city of Brașov, Brașov County, which competes in the Liga III.

The team was created in 2017 by the supporters of the original FC Brașov, which was dissolved that year. "SR" stands for Steagul Roșu ("the Red Flag") or Steagul Renaște ("Steagul Reborn").

Meanwhile, another entity was founded in 2021 and gained permission to use the FC Brașov brand, although it has a continuity issue and enjoys lower fan support.

History

Early modern football in Brașov
Football in Brașov started between 1912 and 1914. In 1928, the unrelated Colțea Brașov won the national title and enjoyed a decade's long rivalry with Braşovia, the city's other major, which reached the semifinals of the Romanian National League in 1925.

Uzinele Astra Brașov made their debut in the Romanian league system in the 1939–1940 season, when it competed in the Braşov District Championship, finishing 3rd in Group 2. The club achieved promotion to Divizia B next season by winning the District Championship final, but the competition was postponed because of the Second World War. During the war championships (unofficial status), UAB battled for promotion in Divizia A at the end of the 1942–1943, losing the playoffs to Uzinele Metallurgice Cugir. The 1943–1944 season was halted midway because of the Allied bombing missions over Romania. The city of Braşov was, alongside Bucharest and Ploieşti, one of the main targets, and Uzinele Astra Braşov were bombed on two occasions, April 16 and June 6 of 1944, sustaining major damages.

The club finished 4th în Group 1 of the District Championship of the 1945–1946 season, the first official post war competition, and 3rd in Divizia C 1946–1947, in which the starting XI was formed by: Moraru - Orghidan, Szurd - Nichita, Zelenak, Grosaru - Nagy, Antonescu, Herold, Caceavski, Vlad.

Uzinele Astra Braşov's biggest rival during the 1940-1950 period were ACFR Braşov. In the 1941–1942 season, UAB lost top spot in the District Championship to ACFR by goal difference, were defeated 4–0 in the 1947 final for promotion in Divizia B, but won the 1950 District Championship Final with 3–0 on aggregate (3-0 home, 0–0 away).

Insolvency and bankruptcy of FC Brașov
In the spring of 2015 FC Brașov had financial problems and went into insolvency.  In the summer of 2015 all the team's players changed and the target was promotion to Liga I. But by the end of the season they were in 5th place, outside the promotion places.

In the summer of 2016 the team did not have the budget needed to participate in Liga II and financial problems continued to multiply. The situation was saved with a few weeks before the start of the new season when Alexandru Chipciu, a former player of the team, was sold by Steaua București to Anderlecht and FC Brașov received a stake in the transfer. Cornel Țălnar was named the new manager and the goal was still promotion, considered the only financial recovery solution of the club. The team started well, but finished the season in 7th place.

After the end of the championship, FC Brașov announced that the team will not join the new season of Liga II, and was declared bankrupt.

Establishment of SR Brașov
In the summer of 2017 The Flag-bearers Supporters League announced the establishment of AS SR (meaning: Asociația Sportivă Steagul Roșu - The Red Flag Sporting Association) Brașov, club set up by the model followed by FC Vaslui, Petrolul Ploiești, Oțelul Galați or Farul Constanța, big clubs in Romanian football which were also dissolved and brought back to life by their supporters.

In the summer of 2021, Corona Brașov merged with ACS Scotch Club (FC Brașov brand bearer) and established FC Brașov (2021). The supporters refused to support the new project.

Stadium

The club plays its home matches on Stadionul Silviu Ploeșteanu from Brașov, a stadium with a capacity of 8,800 seats, the biggest of Brașov County.

Support
SR Brașov has many supporters in Brașov County. The ultras groups of SR Brașov are organized in The Flag-bearers Supporters League and they have friendly relations with Gaz Metan Mediaș and Ceahlăul Piatra Neamț's fans.

Honours

Domestic

Leagues
Liga III
Runners-up (1): 2020–21
Liga IV – Brașov County
Winners (1): 2017–18

Players

First team squad

Out on loan

Notable players

Managerial history

Club officials

Board of directors

Current technical staff

League history

References

External links
Official website

 
Football clubs in Brașov
Football clubs in Brașov County
Sport in Brașov
Association football clubs established in 2017
Fan-owned football clubs
Liga III clubs
Liga IV clubs
2017 establishments in Romania